Concord High School or Concord School is the name of several schools in the United States and Australia:

United States 

 Concord High School (Arkansas)
 Concord High School (California)
 Concord International High School, former school in Santa Monica, California
 Concord High School (Delaware)
 Concord School (Miccosukee), a historic one-room school in Leon County, Florida
 Concord High School (Indiana), in Elkhart
 Concord-Carlisle High School, Massachusetts
 Concord High School (Concord, Michigan)
 Concord High School (New Hampshire)
 Concord High School (North Carolina)
 Concord School House (Philadelphia), Pennsylvania

Australia 
 Concord High School (Sydney)

See also  
 Concordia High School (Edmonton), Concordia College and subsequently Concordia College High School until 1997
 Concord Elementary School (disambiguation)
 Concord (disambiguation)